New Haflong railway station is a main railway station in Dima Hasao district, Assam. Its code is NHLG. It serves Haflong town. The station consists of three platforms.

New Haflong lies on Lumding–Sabroom section provides the rail connectivity in Haflong with Guwahati and Silchar.

Major trains

Some of the important trains that runs from New Haflong are :
New Delhi - Agartala Tejas Rajdhani Express
Sir M. Visvesvaraya Terminal - Agartala Humsafar Express
Silchar–New Delhi Poorvottar Sampark Kranti Superfast Express
Silchar - Thiruvananthapuram Aronai Superfast Express
Silchar - Coimbatore Superfast Express
Silchar - Sealdah Kanchanjunga Express
Agartala - Firozpur Cantonment Tripura Sundari Express
Agartala - Deoghar Weekly Express
Agartala - Sealdah Kanchanjunga Express
Silchar - New Tinsukia Barak Brahmaputra Express
Guwahati–Silchar Express

References

Railway stations in Dima Hasao district
Lumding railway division